The 2016–17 FC Basel season is the 124th season in club history and the club's 22nd consecutive season in the top flight of Swiss football. Basel are the reigning Swiss Super League champions. They prepared their season with various warm-up matches against teams from Germany, Russia and France as well as from Switzerland. The 2016–17 Swiss Super League season started on the week-end 23/24 July, the last round was played on 2 June 2017. Basel started with a home game against Sion.

Basel were qualified for the 2016–17 UEFA Champions League in the Group stage. The draw was held on 25 August 2016, at the Grimaldi Forum in Monaco. Basel were drawn into Group A along with Paris Saint-Germain, Arsenal and Ludogorets Razgrad. The first game was at home against Razgrad on 13 September and the last being the home game against Arsenal on 6 December.

The draw for the first round of the 2016–17 Swiss Cup was held on 1 July 2016. The Super- and Challenge League clubs were seeded and could not be drawn against each other. The lower division teams were granted home game advantage. The first round was played on the week-end 13/14 August 2016. The final was played in Stade de Genève on 25 May 2017.

Club

FC Basel Holding AG
The FC Basel Holding AG owns 75% of FC Basel 1893 AG and the other 25% is owned by the club FC Basel 1893 members. The shareholders of the Holding AG were Bernhard Heusler, Stephan Werthmüller and Georg Heitz. The club FC Basel 1893 functions as a base club independent of the holding company and the AG. FC Basel 1893 AG is responsible for the operational business of the club, e.g. the 1st team, a large part of the youth department and the back office are affiliated to the AG. All decisions that affect the club FC Basel 1893 are made within the AG.

Club management
The FC Basel AGM took place on 18 June 2016. The board of directors under president Bernhard Heusler with vice-president Adrian Knup, sport director Georg Heitz, financial manager Stephan Werthmüller and marketing manager René Kamm, and the three directors Reto Baumgartner, Dominik Donzé and Benno Kaiser were willing to continue as before. They were all re-elected unanimously.

Team management 
Urs Fischer had a running three-year contract as first team manager, which started in June 2015. His assistants were Werner Leuthard, Marco Walker and Markus Hoffmann. Massimo Colomba was the Goalkeeper coach. Massimo Ceccaroni was head of the FCB Youth System. The new coach of the Youth Team (U–21) was Raphaël Wicky.

Overview

Offseason and preseason
At the end of the 2015–16 FC Basel season Philipp Degen ended his football career and retired from professional football. Between the years 2001 to 2005 and again from 2011 to 2016 Degen played a total of 333 games for Basel scoring a total of 18 goals. 158 of these games were in the Swiss Super League, 22 in the Swiss Cup, 39 were in a UEFA European-competitions (Champions League, UEFA Cup, Europa League and UIC) and 114 were friendly games. He scored eleven goals in the domestic league, one in the cup, one in the Champions League and the other five were scored during the test games. During his career with FCB Degen won the Swiss championship eight times and the domestic cup twice.

Also, during the previous season Behrang Safari decided to return to Sweden due to family reasons at the end of the season. He signed for Malmö FF. Between the years 2008 to 2011 and again from 2013 to 2016_ Safari played a total of 291 games for Basel scoring a total of 3 goals. 157 of these games were in the Swiss Super League, 14 in the Swiss Cup, 59 were in a UEFA European-competitions (Champions League and Europa League) and 61 were friendly games. He scored one goal in the domestic league, the other two were scored during the test games. During his six seasons with FCB Safari won the Swiss championship five times and the domestic cup once.

At the end of the 2015–16 FC Basel season Walter Samuel also ended his football career. Behrang Safari left the club to continue his career by his home club Malmö FF. Breel Embolos transfer to Schalke 04 was confirmed by both teams on 26 June. Despite the fact that he still had a valid contract Naser Aliji joined 2. Bundesliga side 1. FC Kaiserslautern on a free transfer.

Basel announced on 31 August that the contract between them and the 26-year-old Egyptian international Ahmed Hamoudi had been resolved on mutual consent with immediate effect. On 2 September Basel announced that Nicolas Hunziker had been loaned out to the Grasshoppers to gain playing experience. That far during the current season Hunziker had played four games in the Promotion League with the FCB U-21 team, scoring five goals.

On 4 May Basel announced that they had signed 18 year old Paraguayan defender Blás Riveros from Olimpia Asunción on a five-year deal. Due to Riveros commitments with the Paraguay national football team and the Copa America, he was not expected to join the Basel first team until the beginning of July. On 10 May Basel also announced that they had signed Egyptian defender Omar Gaber from Zamalek on a four-year deal. On 15 June Serbian goalkeeper Đorđe Nikolić transferred in from Jagodina, signing a four-year contract. Basel announced on 28 June that they had signed Seydou Doumbia on loan from Roma until 30 June 2017. Three further transfers in were Mohamed Elyounoussi who signed in from Molde, Kevin Bua who came from Zürich and Éder Balanta who transferred in from River Plate. Each of whom signed a four-year deal. One former player transferred back in from VfB Stuttgart, Geoffroy Serey Die, who had left the club a year and a half before due to differences with the former team manager Paulo Sousa.

Mid-season break
On 25 January 2017 Basel announced that Birkir Bjarnason had transferred out  and Aston Villa confirmed the move. On 31 January 2017 Basel announced that Jean-Paul Boëtius was loaned out to K.R.C. Genk until the end of the season.

The Campaign

Domestic League
First half of season
Basel's priority aim for the new season is to win the league championship for the eighth consecutive time. The 2016–17 Swiss Super League season started on the week-end 23/24 July. Basel played at home game against Sion. Four of the new signings, Gabar, Balanta, Elyounoussi and Doumbia made their first team league debuts in the 3–0 home win. Doumbia scored his first goal for his new club in the same game and just one week later on 31 July during the away game against Vaduz he scored his second. It was the last goal of the game and Basel won 5–1. Basel took first position in the league table from the very beginning. In fact they started the season very well, winning each of their first seven games, scoring at least three goals in each fixture. After these seven games they were nine points clear of BSC Young Boys in second place and Luzern in third. They had scored 24 goals conceding just five. By the winter break Basel had extended their lead to 12 points ahead of the Young Boys who were in second place in the league table, winning 15, drawing two and only one defeat, scoring 49 and conceding just 15 goals in their 18 matches.

Second half of season
The second half of season began on 4 February 2017. In their first game Elyounoussi scored a hat trick for Basel during the home game against Lugano. These were the first three goals and were scored during the first 36 minutes of the game that Basel won 4–0. Basel won nine, drawing three during February, March and April to move clear at the top of the table. Despite that they suffered a defeat in the Stade de Suisse in round 34 against second placed Young Boys, Basel ended the season 17 points clear of their rivals.

Basel were victors in 26 matches, drew eight and suffered only two defeats in the 36 Super League matches, gaining a total of 86 points. The team scored 92 goals (league's highest scorers) with 35 goals against (league's best defence) and ended with a goal difference of +57. Basel's Seydou Doumbia was the club and the Super League top goalscorer with 20 goals. Marc Janko scored 13, both Matías Delgado and Mohamed Elyounoussi ended the season with ten goals. Elyounoussi was the team's top final pass giver with 13 assists.

Domestic Cup
Basel's clear aim for the 2016–17 Swiss Cup is to regain the title that they last won in 2011–12. The draw for the first round was held on 1 July 2016. In the first-round teams from Super League and Challenge League were seeded and could not play against each other. In a match, the home advantage was granted to the team from the lower league, if applicable.

Rapperswil-Jona (14 August 2016)
Basel were drawn away against Rapperswil-Jona who at that time played in the 1. Liga Promotion, the third tier in the Swiss football pyramid. The match was played in the Stadion Grünfeld in Rapperswil with an attendance of 4,350 fans and this was a stadium record. The underdogs started well into the game and the visitors had problems getting into their game. Until the interval the few opportunities that FCB created were all wasted or the ball was saved by the well reacting goalkeeping. Even after the break the favourites had problems with themselves. But in the end the minimum margin was enough for FCB to the advance to the next round. Midfielder Jean-Paul Boëtius, so far without a single minute of play in the league, saved the team from possibly malicious comments, with the only goal of the game. The leader of the Promotion League braced themselves with flying colours and tactical skill against the Champions League participants, who, however, only made the minimum of efforts. The FCRJ defended flawlessly until the 58th minute, before the Dutch Boëtius beat the brilliant amateur goalkeeper Diego Yanz for the only time.

Zug 94 (18 September 2016)
Teams from Super League were seeded in round 2 and the home advantage was granted to the team from the lower league. Basel were drawn against Zug 94, who at that time played in the 1. Liga, the fourth tier of Swiss football. The match was played in the Herti Allmend Stadion in Zug with an attendance of 4,200 spectators. The FCB coach Urs Fischer rested the entire first team, bringing in eleven new players compared with their last match. The only goal of the match was scored by Daniel Hoegh with a header in the 45th minute. Following corner from Jean Paul Boëtius to the rear post, the central defender jumped the highest to score an unsavable goal. The lower-class team tried everything to make up for this narrow deficit, but realistic opportunities to do so were hardly to be seen. Basel again had to be content with a minimal 1–0 win away against Zug 94. FCB's second formation did not do more than required to advance. Apart from the always committed Geoffroy Serey Die, one or the other player's ambition to play in the starting line-up was completely missing.

Tuggen (26 October 2016)
There was no seeding in round 3, but the home advantage was still granted to the team from the lower league. Basel were drawn against Tuggen, who at that time played in the 1. Liga Promotion, the third tier of Swiss football. Referee of the natch held in the Linthstrasse in Tuggen with an attendance of 4,150 fans was Sascha Amhof. The FCB coach Urs Fischer had announced in advance that he would not rest the entire first team against Tuggen, as he did in the last round. Tuggen started well into the match and the underdogs had the first big chance of the game, but the shot went wide. Basel's first chance came on eight minutes, a cross from Michael Lang was headed away by the defence but the ball landed at Jean-Paul Boëtius feet and his cross-goal shot made it 1–0 for the visitors. Ten minutes later, the Dutchman doubled up from the penalty point after Lang had been fouled in the area. Lang scored the 3–0 in the 35th minute after a corner from Luca Zuffi. Shortly before the break, Eder Balanta made it 4–0 following another corner Zuffi. Four minutes after the break Birkir Bjarnason's shot was deflected and landed on the top of the cross bar. After an hour FCB started to take things easier, changing a gear lower and so saved the lower-tier team from a runaway defeat. The motto was live and let live or rather play and let play. Tuggen's captain Shala had a good header, but over the top, Serey Die's long-range hammer was punched away by Tuggen keeper Waldvogel. Tuggen came better into play and after two/three chances eventually scored the consolation goal through Jusuf Shala in stoppage time. The FCB moved confidently into the quarter-finals.

Zürich (2 March 2017)
In the draw to the quarter-final Basel were matched against Zürich, who were the cup holders and had at the same time been relegated to the second tier. The draw had given Basel home advantage and the St. Jakob-Park was full of atmosphere with an attendance of 25,259 fans, but the mood changed quickly as Oliver Buff put the visitors in front in the third minute. The atmosphere on the pitch was equally rough, referee Alain Bieri pulled his cards regularly. A yellow card for Basel's Renato Steffen after 8 minutes (but it could also have been red), for Zürich's Alain Nef and Cédric Brunner in the 14th minute and for Basel's Taulant Xhaka on 28 minutes. But football was also played, Basel's Marc Janko marked the equaliser per head on 20 minutes after a cross from Michael Lang. Following a Basel free kick, the Züricher defence cleared the ball to the right, Lang controlled the ball on the by-line and hit it low to the centre, keeper Andris Vaņins stooped to pick it up, but it bounced into the net from his leg. Taulant Xhaka was shown the second yellow card on 56, but even with one player less, the hosts were better. Renato Steffen scored with a long range left foot effort on 75 minutes and Basel earned themselves the 3–1 win to qualify for the semi-final.

Winterthur (5 April 2017)
The draw for the semi-final gave Winterthur a home tie in the Schützenwiese with an attendance of 9,400 fans sold-out and these saw an attractive match between the actual bottom club in the Challenge League and the Super League leaders. Ball possession was level, but Winterthur created the better opportunities in the first period. Basel keeper Tomáš Vaclík pushed one effort from Gianluca Frontino in extremis against the post and he made three further big saves before the break. Renato Steffen had the best chance for Basel in the 20th minute. In the 51st minute referee Sascha Amhof awarded a penalty for Basel and this gave ground for many discussions after the match, because Winterthur's Captain Patrik Schuler played ball and man, in that order. Matías Delgado converted the spot-kick. But the game remained dramatic, until the 85th minute, when Basel netted their second goal following a set piece. The free-kick from the right was brought high into the area, the ball was headed towards the left, Delgado played it backwards towards Luca Zuffi, his shot was blocked by keeper Matthias Minder, but the ball fell for Manuel Akanji who scored from close distance. Of all people Akanji, the former Winterthur youth and first team player. But just two minutes later Tomáš Vaclík restored the dramatic. Not under pressure he made an error playing the ball out, it rolled to Arxhend Cani, who converted side footed from 25 metres out. In added time Alexander Fransson scored the 3–1 result for Basel.

Sion (25 May 2017)
The cup final in the 2016–17 Swiss Cup took place in Stade de Genève in Lancy, Geneva between Basel and Sion on Ascension Thursday, a public holiday in Switzerland. Basel had reached the cup final 21 times in the club's history and won the trophy on 11 occasions to this date. A sidenote to here, is that they had ended the cup competitions as runners-up in their last three finals, in 2013 against GC, in 2014 against Zürich and 2015 against today's opponents Sion. Sion had reached 13 finals in their history and had won on all 13 occasions. A side note here, is that the town Sion is the capital of the Canton of Valais and the coat of arms of the Canton has 13 stars in it.

Arbitrator in the final was Stephan Klossner and as he blew his whistle for kick-off, he did this in front of 26,500 fans. It was immediately clear that there was a lot at stake in this match. Both teams were fully commitment right from the start. Therefore, they neutralized each other and even if there was a lot of tempi in play, there were no dangerous scenes for a long time. After half an hour it was FCB who had the first good opportunity, following a Matías Delgado corner Mohamed Elyounoussi's header went slightly wide of the post. This remained the only dangerous scene in the weakly played and largely unemotional first period. The second half began quite different, after just two minutes, Elyounoussi benefited from a mistake by Pa Modou and played to Seydou Doumbia, who found Delgado in a perfect finishing position, and the Argentine gave FCB the lead. The Basel team had to survive a dangerous scene shortly afterwards, but Reto Ziegler's free kick from a favourable position flew well past the goal. Then it was FCB's turn again and became dominant. After about an hour of play Renato Steffen's effort was blocked, but Adama Traoré was well positioned and from close range he poked the ball between keeper Anton Mitryushkin's legs to make it 2–0. There were no real dangerous moments in front of the FCB goal and in the end, the Basel team then made a visual treat with the last move of the game and to the 3–0 win. Marc Janko headed a cross on to Michael Lang, who struck home directly from an acute angle.

Conclusion
It went wrong in their 14th final, the Sion team was defeated by a dominant FCB and lost a cup final for the first time in the club's history. The Sion cup myth was broken. From a FCB point of view, the club's cup aim to reach the final and win the trophy was achieved. By this date the league championship had mathematically been decided and so with this trophy Basel had achieved the domestic double.

Champions League
Basel entered into this season's Champions League in the Group stage. The draw was held on 25 August 2016, at the Grimaldi Forum in Monaco. Basel were drawn into Group A along with Paris Saint-Germain, Arsenal and Ludogorets Razgrad. The first game was at home against Ludogorets on 13 September and the last being the home game against Arsenal on 6 December. The club's initial aim was to remain in the competition after the group stage or else their minimum aim was third position and a transfer to the Europa League knockout phase.

Ludogorets Razgrad (13 September 2016)
The first game was played in St. Jakob-Park with an attendance of 30,852 spectators. Basel took control of the game from the start. But despite a few chances early in the game, Bjarnason on 2 minutes, Steffen 6th minute and Delgado 7th minute, Basel were not able to create many good chances against the massive Ludogorets Razgrad defence. Ludogorets waited for counterattacks. Basel's Janko injured himself and was replaced by Doumbia in the 40th minute. Ludogorets went into the lead just before half time, a breakaway goal by Brazilian forward Cafu. He ran on to a measured pass from Marcelinho, he turned Marek Suchý inside out and slotted in a low shot past Tomáš Vaclík on 45 minutes. Basel dominated the second period. But they created only few clear scoring opportunities, but were then given their chance to equalize as Ludogorets goalkeeper Vladislav Stoyanov flapped at defender Michel Lang's long cross. The ball fell into Steffen's path and he volleyed into an unguarded net from a tight angle (79).

Arsenal (28 September 2016)
Basel's second game was away from home in the Emirates Stadium in front of 59,993 spectators as guests of Arsenal Football Club. This was the first ever meeting between the clubs in European competition. Arsenal made two changes to the side that had beaten Chelsea in the Premier League on the previous Saturday, with David Ospina replacing Petr Čech between the posts. Replacing the injured  Francis Coquelin in the centre of midfield, Granit Xhaka started against the team he began his career with and also faced his brother Taulant for the first time in club football. Mohamed Elneny was also brought on as a substitute against his former side. Urs Fischer, on the other hand, had shuffled his pack from their visit to St. Gallen at the weekend, with his front four completely changing. Theo Walcott scored a first half double, with a brace in assists from Sánchez securing a 2–0 win. The first was a lightning break from Arsenal, a ball over the top found Alexis Sánchez in acres of space in the right hand channel and he deftly whipped in a volleyed cross which the Englishman made no mistake with, burying his header past Vaclík. The second was almost too easy for Arsenal, as they waltzed through the Basel defence again. Walcott strolled up to the edge of the box unchallenged, played a perfect one-two with Alexis Sánchez, who was standing with his back to goal, and clinically dispatched the return ball into the far corner, off the post. The home team were all over the visitors, and their one touch passing was sublime to watch. Walcott and Özil played back to Sánchez, but his shot was incredibly saved by Vaclík. Bellerín had a chance and again Vaclík did brilliantly to parry. It was completely and utterly one sided in North London and Basel looked shell shocked, especially during the first half.

Paris Saint-Germain (19 October 2016)
Basel's second away game in the third round was in the Parc des Princes with an attendance of 46,448 fans as visitors to Paris Saint-Germain. This was also the first ever meeting between these two clubs in European competition. In the 5th Minute Delgado took a corner kick which was headed on to the middle by Bjarnason and then Lang headed the ball onto the cross bar. Lang, Steffen and Doumbia missed further good chances. Another chance for the visitors in the 36th minute and Doumbia's angled header hit the post. In the 40th minute Blaise Matuidi's low cross was touched off by Edinson Cavani and Ángel Di María thundered his right-foot strike the ball into the roof of the net. Lucas Moura put the hosts two goals up on 62 minutes. Suchý had a chance in the 66th minute but his header hit the cross bar, this was the third time that Basel struck the ball against woodwork. In the 93rd minute referee Deniz Aytekin from the German Football Association saw Cavani fall after a light touch from Basel defender Lang and awarded a penalty. Cavani converted the spot-kick to make the result a very unlucky 0–3 for the visitors.

Paris Saint-Germain (1 November 2016)
The return game was played two weeks later at the St. Jakob-Park with an attendance of 30,852 fans. Omar Gaber played his Champions League debut for the home team. PSG found better into the game and they had the early goal chances, but these were not enough to beat keeper Tomáš Vaclík. After about 20 minutes Basel got into the match better, getting support up for their sole striker Seydou Doumbia.  But Paris struck with impeccable timing as half-time approached. A corner was not properly cleared and Thomas Meunier pounced onto the loose ball, driving a fierce shot at goal through the crowd of bodies gathered in the middle. One of those was the unmarked Blaise Matuidi who, probably unintentionally, flicked the ball into the net in the 43rd minute. After the half-time break Basel searched for their chances but had no luck. Just as it looked like a goal would not come from anywhere for Basel, it came practically out of nowhere. Substitute Luca Zuffi took aim from almost 40 metres out and suddenly everything had the desired impact. The substitute way out on the by-line tried to pick out Marc Janko in the area with a cross, but instead he drifted a ball in that sailed over goalkeeper Alphonse Areola and into the net (76 minutes). In the 84th minute Serey Dié received a second yellow card and was dismissed. Despite this, only two minutes later Janko had the best chance for a winner for Basel but he missed the crossed ball. Thomas Meunier, however, scored that for Paris in the last minute of the game.

Ludogorets Razgrad (23 November 2016)
The return game against Ludogorets Razgrad was played in Vasil Levski National Stadium in Sofia, because their regular stadium, Ludogorets Arena, Razgrad does not reach UEFA requirements. Basel fielded their strongest team, but Ludogorets had to withdraw midfielder Marcelinho with a hamstring injury. Ludogrets had 55% ball possession, but Basel created the most and the better chances. Goalkeeper Vladislav Stoyanov made several fine stops to keep Basel at bay. However, the game ended goalless and both teams collected their second point in the group stage. Basel coach Urs Fischer said after the match; "We gave our best, we had a good game, but we failed to convert our chances. There is one more game left, but it could have been much better if we had won tonight. We tried everything, I played with all my forwards, but that was not enough, unfortunately."

Arsenal (6 December 2016)
The situation before this last group stage match was clear, Basel had to obtain more points than Ludogorets Razgrad to qualify for the Europa League knock out stage and Arsenal had to obtain more points than Paris Saint-Germain to win the group. Two former Basel players were in the Arsenal team, Mohamed Elneny and Granit Xhaka whose elder brother Taulant lined up for the home team. The game was decided early, two defending mistakes soon after the kick-off gave Arsenal two goal scoring chances. Both of which were taken with ease and the visitors were leading by two goals after just quarter of an hour. Lucas Pérez's hat-trick in the 47th minute inspired Arsenal to a 4–1 triumph, with Alex Iwobi adding the fourth goal after 53 minutes. Basel substitute Seydou Doumbia managed a fine consolation goal for hosts, but this came on 78 minutes and was too late to make any change in the result. Paris's 2–2 draw with Ludogorets meant Arsenal win Group A, Basel finished bottom and were eliminated from the European competitions.

Conclusion
In advance of the group stage it was clear that Basel's two games against Ludogorets would be their most important games in the group stage, considering their realistic objective of finishing third. With only a draw at home on matchday 1, things started disappointingly. The away tie against Arsenal was decided early in the game. The away game against Paris Saint-Germain can be written off as unlucky because of the woodwork. Matchday 4 against PSG was a close affair and can also written off as unlucky because the deciding penalty goal came in added time. The goalless draw with Ludogorets on matchday 5 must be described as ineffective and helpless. The final game against Arsenal was a clear defeat. Basel missed not only their initial aim of remaining in the competition after the group stage, but they also missed their minimum aim for third position and the transfer to the Europa League knockout phase.

Players

First team squad 
The following is the list of the Basel first team squad. It also includes players that were in the squad the day the season started on 23 July but subsequently left the club after that date.

Loans

In on loan

Out on loan

Transfers summer 2016

In

Out

Transfers winter 2016-17

Out

Results and fixtures 
Kickoff times are in CET

Legend

Friendly matches

Pre- and mid-season

Winter break

Swiss Super League

First half of season

Second half of season

League table

Swiss Cup 

The draw for the first round was held on 1 July 2016. The Super- and Challenge League clubs were seeded and could not be drawn against each other. The lower division teams were granted home advantage and Basel were therefore drawn away, in Rapperswil. The home advantage was also granted to the team from the lower league in the second and third rounds.

UEFA Champions League

Group stage 

Basel were qualified for the 2016–17 UEFA Champions League in the Group stage. The draw was held on 25 August 2016, at the Grimaldi Forum in Monaco. Basel were drawn into Group A along with Paris Saint-Germain, Arsenal and Ludogorets Razgrad. The first match was at home game against Razgrad.

Matches

Notes

Final group table

See also
 History of FC Basel
 List of FC Basel players
 List of FC Basel seasons

References

Sources
 Rotblau: Jahrbuch Saison 2017/2018. Publisher: FC Basel Marketing AG. 
 Die ersten 125 Jahre / 2018. Publisher: Josef Zindel im Friedrich Reinhardt Verlag, Basel. 
 Season 2016–17 at "Basler Fussballarchiv” homepage
 Switzerland 2016–17 at RSSSF

External links
 

Basel
Basel
FC Basel seasons
Swiss football championship-winning seasons